Hyun Seung-min (born September 17, 1999), known professionally as Jung Ji-so is a South Korean actress. Hyun made her acting debut as a child actress in the 2012 television drama May Queen. She is best known internationally for her role as Park Da-hye in Parasite, which won the Palme d'Or at the Cannes Film Festival and the Academy Award for Best Picture. For her performance in the film, she won the Screen Actors Guild Award for Outstanding Performance by a Cast in a Motion Picture.

Filmography

Film

Television series

Web series

Awards and nominations

Notes

References 

1999 births
Living people
South Korean child actresses
South Korean television actresses
South Korean film actresses
Better ENT artists
Actresses from Seoul
Outstanding Performance by a Cast in a Motion Picture Screen Actors Guild Award winners